Kronstad Station is a former station at Kronstad in Bergen, Norway opened in 1913 and closed in 1965. It was served by trains on the Bergen Line until January 1965, when the stretch on which the station was located was closed following the opening of the Ulriken Tunnel in 1964. The former station is located south of the Kronstad Tunnel, which passes under Haukeland University Hospital and Møllendal Cemetery between Kronstad and Fløen. There were plans for converting the tunnel into a bicycle path, as it is rarely used by trains nowadays.

References

Railway stations in Bergen